Dex Lee (born 16 May 1993) is an English actor, known for his role as Bear Sylvester on the BBC soap opera Doctors. Before he was cast in Doctors, he appeared in numerous professional stage productions and worked part-time as a dance teacher.

Early life
Lee was born on 16 May 1993 in Edmonton, London. Lee has a younger sister, Miriam-Teak Lee, as well as four brothers. Alongside his sister, he attended The Latymer School, Morgan Aslanoff School of Dance and Arts Educational School with. The pair were duet partners and competed in dance competitions together. After graduating from ArtsEd in 2014, Lee worked as a dance teacher in Chiswick.

Career
From 2012 to 2013, Lee appeared as part of the dance ensemble in a production of Snow White and the Seven Dwarfs. In 2014, Lee made his acting debut in a production of In The Heights as Jose at the Southwark Playhouse. After his 2014 role in The Scottsboro Boys on the West End, he performed for the London Cast Album, including solos in Alabama Ladies and the reprise as his secondary role, Victoria Price. In 2016, Lee starred in Father Comes Home from the Wars. Steph Watkins of A Younger Theatre wrote: "Odyssey the dog, played by Dex Lee, is a highlight from the performance. Lee absolutely embodies the characteristics of a dog without making it overly literal. His vocal work is outstanding, highlighting certain words to reflect aspects and emotional responses of a dog without impersonating, which works impeccably. He carefully displays the naivety, purity and innocence of a dog whilst narrating incidents that take place without action; it is an effective story-telling tool as well as being one of the most memorable parts of the show due to how Lee handles the text."

In 2017, he appeared in the West End production of The Wild Party as Jackie. Bethany Davidson of A Younger Theatre described his performance as "insatiable, oozing confidence whilst he lolls and rolls around the room". Lee continued to make appearances in stage productions until 2019, when he stated he wanted to make television appearances. Subsequently, he was cast in the BBC soap opera Doctors in 2019. Lee began filming on Doctors on 26 June 2019, and he made his first on-screen appearance as Bear Sylvester on 18 November 2019.

Stage

Filmography

Awards and nominations

References

External links
 

1993 births
21st-century English male actors
English male musical theatre actors
English male stage actors
English male soap opera actors
Black British male actors
Living people
People from Edmonton, London